Nogometni Klub Zagorec Krapina is a Croatian football club based in the town of Krapina.
The club was found in 1908. They play their home matches at stadion ŠRC Podgora.

Zagorec is the most successful club in Zagorje county having played five consecutive seasons in Croatian Second League (2HNL), from 1995 to 2000. The "golden era" of club was in the season of 1997–1998 when they finished third, having won qualification for 1HNL. They were placed in the second qualification group along with Nk Cibalia Vinkovci and Rnk Split. First game was against Rnk Split in which Zagorec won 1:0 so the decisive match was against Nk Cibalia. The match, which was played in Zagreb at the stadium of Kranjčevićeva ends with a score of 2:2, and with this result Cibalia goes ito 1.HNL. The match was followed by many controversies that have damaged the club from Krapina.

Zagorec currently competes in 3HNL West.

Trophies 

Cup NSKZŽ 2011–2012.

Cup NSKZŽ 2012–2013.

Cup NSKZŽ 2017–2018.

Cup NSKZŽ 2018–2019.

1. ŽNL KRAPINSKO ZAGORSKA 2012–2013.

Recent seasons

Fans 

During the 1990s Nk Zagorec was the favourite club in the Zagorje county. Fan group "Šumski gujdeki" in large number cheered team on both local and away matches. At the end of 90s group had fallen apart.

Stadium 

Universiade in Zagreb 1987. enable to build the "ŠRC Podgora" stadium, which includes a main football pitch, athletics track and an auxiliary field. In addition to the main playground there are stands with total of 1,360 seats and a building with four dressing rooms, toilets and catering facilities.
In 2015, there was a complete reconstruction of the stands, new seats have replaced, and the existing and new roof was built, which covers about 200 people.
By changing the leadership of the club in 2017. the first reconstruction phase of the locker room was finished and the clubhouse roof was changed.

Current squad

References

External links
Official website 

Football clubs in Croatia
Football clubs in Krapina-Zagorje County
Association football clubs established in 1919
1919 establishments in Croatia